John Lawrence Trautmann (born June 29, 1968) is an American long-distance runner. He competed in the men's 5000 metres at the 1992 Summer Olympics.

References

External links
 

1968 births
Living people
American male long-distance runners
Olympic male long-distance runners
Olympic track and field athletes of the United States
Athletes (track and field) at the 1992 Summer Olympics
Place of birth missing (living people)
20th-century American people